Lexie Liu, also known as Liu Boxin (born December 21, 1998), is a Chinese singer, rapper and songwriter. In 2015, she participated in K-pop Star 5, a South Korean reality TV competition series where her group came in fourth place. In July 2018, she participated in The Rap of China and won fourth place, which launched her career as a solo artist. In February 2019, Liu released her debut EP 2030 in the United States with eight singles including "Outta Time" featuring Killy, "Love and Run", "Hat Trick", and "Nada".
She also featured as Seraphine in the K/DA song "More".

Early life 

Liu was born and raised in Changsha, Hunan. She has been interested in music since she was young; she started to dance when she was four years old and learned to play the piano starting at six years old. When Liu was in grade eleven, she transferred to an international high school. However, she took a gap year when she was in grade twelve to make music. She went to Korea and participated in the reality TV competition series, K-pop Star 5, under her birth name Liu Yuyu, as a member of a 4-person girl group named "Mazinga S" which won fourth place.

While shooting the TV show K-pop Star 5, Liu applied and was accepted to Fordham University to study global business. However, she later left to pursue her music career.

Career

2016–present: Indie career, 2030, Meta Ego, and Gone Gold
In January 2017, Liu's first original single "Coco Made Me Do It" was released and achieved more than 5 million views. In February 2017, she performed at SXSW music festival, one of the largest music festivals in the world, bringing Chinese Pop music to the US audience.

In January 2018, she composed a song called "Role" for Li Yifeng, a Chinese popular idol, singer, and actor.

In July 2018, Liu participated in The Rap of China, entered the final round with a song "Mulan," and eventually won fourth place. While competing in The Rap of China, Liu signed with American label 88rising.

In November, she released her new song "Sleep Away" from her upcoming debut EP 2030 which was previously released in China. The Fader named the track as one of “10 Songs You Need in Your Life”, Nylon listed it as the “Best Music Releases Of The Week", and Refinery29 said “their ears are very into Lexie.”

On 18 December 2018, Liu released her new cyberpunk-influenced single "Nada", complete with futuristic-themed music video. The Line of Best Fit described "Nada" as it "sees Lexie Liu's fierce, cross-cultural grit thrust into a science fiction dimension where language barriers don't exist, She fuses Mandopop with grimy beats against the visuals of her accompanying Tron-esque video, directed by mamesjao, in a retro-futuristic digital world." "Nada" also made its appearance on "Best Of the Week" by Apple Music once it came out.

In February 2019, Liu released her debut EP 2030 in the United States, which included two new singles "Outta Time" featuring Killy and "Love and Run".

In September 2019 her single "Ok, Ok, Ok" was released.

On December 27, 2019, her album Meta Ego was released.

On October 28, 2020, Liu voiced the champion Seraphine in Riot Games' virtual K-pop group, K/DA, in their new song "More" from their extended play All Out. Liu also performed on stage at the 2020 League of Legends World Championship in Shanghai.

On January 28, 2021, Liu released her second EP Gone Gold internationally (released as Online 上线了 in China), featuring her then-newest single "ALGTR" which was self-written and self-produced alongside the rest of the EP. It marked yet another change in sound direction, with the EP taking in significantly more electro-pop influences compared to previous efforts. The project's contemporary theme, reflected in the title track's music videos and the rest of the track list's visualisers which were directed by frequent collaborator Jeremy Z. Qin, revolves around the idea of living in an online game as a character. It was inspired by the unrest experienced throughout 2020 as a result of the worldwide COVID-19 pandemic, where Liu's only source of understanding the world was solely through a screen - leading her to imagine what life would be like without this source.

On 21 November 2022, Liu released a single by the name of "Fortuna" with an accompanying music video. "Fortuna" marks a slight change in Liu's style as a high-energy, electropop-inspired track making use of Mandarin, English, and Spanish in the lyrics. The song's lyrics and music video were heavily inspired by Egyptian mythology and tarot divination, having been named after the Roman goddess Fortuna, and making references to the Egyptian deities of Set and Anubis.

On 29 November 2022, Liu followed up the release of "Fortuna" with a single entitled "Magician," with both songs having been inspired by the same theme of tarot divination. The lyrics make reference to the major arcana of the Magician, the Moon, the Sun, and the general suits of the Cups, the Wands, and the Pentacles found in tarot decks. The musical style of "Magician" is a further exploration of heavy electronic music and was performed in English and Mandarin.

Public image

Lexie Liu's distinct appearance caught the attention of the fashion industry where she landed placements in Paris Fashion Week 2019 as the brand ambassador for Yves Saint Laurent eyewear in the Asia Pacific Region, Louis Vuitton Show 2018 in China, Puma's Suede 50 campaign and Levi's New Years TVC campaign.

Lexie Liu has also been featured on the print pages of East Asia's most prominent fashion publications, including Vogue me (China), BAZAAR China, Nylon Japan, and Nylon China.

The American fashion magazine V described her as "the face of a generation of new Chinese artists breaking into the American mainstream with a uniquely, cross-cultural sound."

"Lexie Liu proves her status as China’s next global superstar with the futuristic 'Nada'," described by The Line of Best Fit, "born and raised in Changsha, China, 19-year-old Lexie Liu's "Nada' is her third single release after signing to 88rising." "Lexie Liu is spearheading the new generation of East Asian artists making waves in the global music industry. She became the youngest Chinese artist to ever perform at SXSW last year after rising to fame on South Korean TV show 'K-pop Star' and finishing fourth on the heavily male-dominated rap talent show 'The Rap of China'".

After the release of her single "Like A Mercedes", the cyberpunk-inspired music video of the song was Lexie Liu's first introduction to a global audience, showing off how "her provocative sound is transcending language barriers."

Her debut EP released in February 2019 was highly recommended, "with a feature from Killy on Outta Time, plus new singles Sleep Away, Hat Trick and Nada, the eight-tracker is an impressive bilingual project showcasing the Changsha born and raised artist’s skills across rap, R&B vocals and production."

American fashion and culture magazine Flaunt also made a praising comment on Lexie's debut EP 2030, which is said to "narrates her life and journey within music; manifesting her inner-psyche through dream-like vocals and vibrant musical films. Dynamic in all aspects, Lexie holds a promising trajectory in the years to come."

Filmography

Variety shows

Discography

Albums/EPs
 (2018.10) 2029
 (2019.02) 2030 (EP)
 (2019.12) Meta Ego 无限意识
 (2021.01) GONE GOLD 上线了
 (2022.12) The Happy Star 幸福星

Singles

Collaboration with brands
 In January 2022, Lexie Liu becomes the new model of Ford EVOS.
 In October 2021, Liu became the brand ambassador for Miu Miu in the China region.
 In March 2019, Liu became the brand ambassador for Saint Laurent Eyewear in the Asia Pacific Region.
 In November 2018, Liu was invited as one of the celebrity guests to attend the Louis Vuitton show named "Volez Voguez Voyage."
 In December 2017, Liu participated in the shooting of Levis' New-Year TVC campaign called Gan Jiu Xing.She also appeared as the model in posters in local Levis stores across the globe. 
 In October 2017, Liu collaborated with Puma and became a member of the Puma's Group, and attended Puma SUEDE, the Puma's 50th-anniversary party.

Awards and nominations

References

External links

1998 births
Living people
Mandopop musicians
Chinese singers
Chinese women singers
Chinese women rappers
Chinese producers
Singers from Hunan
Musicians from Changsha
21st-century Chinese women singers
K-pop Star participants